Manchester is a town in Hartford County, Connecticut, United States. As of the 2020 census, the town had a total population of 59,713. The urban center of the town is the Manchester census-designated place, with a population of 36,379 at the 2020 census. The town is named after Manchester, in England.

History

The area known as Manchester began its recorded history as the camping grounds of a small band of peaceful Native Americans known as the Podunk tribe. The area was settled by colonists around 1673, some 40 years after Thomas Hooker led a group of Puritans from Massachusetts Bay Colony to found Hartford.

At the time it was known just as Orford Parish, a name that can still be found on the memorial to the Revolutionary soldiers from the town. The many rivers and brooks provided power for paper, lumber, and textile industries, and the town quickly evolved into an industrial center. The town of Hartford once included the land now occupied by the towns of Manchester, East Hartford, and West Hartford. In 1783, East Hartford became a separate town, which included Manchester in its city limits until 1823.

The Pitkin Glassworks operated from 1783 to 1830 as the first successful glassworks in Connecticut. The owner of the glassworks, Captain Richard Pitkin, was given a 25-year monopoly on glass as recompense for providing gunpowder to the Continental Army during the American Revolution. The Pitkin Glassworks Ruin has been preserved by the town's historical society.

In 1838, the Cheney family started what became the world's largest silk mill. Eventually, the Cheney family employed a quarter of residents and actively recruited immigrants to work in the mills. The manufacturing presence in the town made Manchester an ideal industrial community. The mills, houses of the owners, and homes of the workers are now part of the Cheney Brothers Historic District, a National Historic Landmark.

Also of note are the E.E. Hilliard Company Woolen Mills. Founded ca. 1780 by Aaron Buckland and later sold to the Hilliard family, the Hilliard Mills are the oldest woolen mill site in the country.

Geography

Demographics

As of the census of 2000, there were 54,740 people, 23,197 households, and 14,010 families residing in the town. The racial makeup of the town was 82.77% White, 8.42% African American, 0.20% Native American, 3.15% Asian, 0.03% Pacific Islander, 3.12% from other races, and 2.31% from two or more races. Hispanic or Latino of any race were 6.54% of the population.

There were 23,197 households, out of which 28.2% had children under the age of 18 living with them, 43.8% were married couples living together, 13.0% had a female householder with no husband present, and 39.6% were non-families. Of all households, 31.1% were made up of individuals, and 10.1% had someone living alone who was 65 years of age or older. The average household size was 2.32 and the average family size was 2.93.

In the town, the population was spread out, with 22.8% under the age of 18, 8.0% from 18 to 24, 33.0% from 25 to 44, 22.1% from 45 to 64, and 14.2% who were 65 years of age or older. The median age was 36 years. For every 100 females, there were 91.2 males. For every 100 females age 18 and over, there were 87.7 males.

The median income for a household in the town was $49,426, and the median income for a family was $58,769. Males had a median income of $41,893 versus $32,562 for females. The per capita income for the town was $25,989. About 6.0% of families and 8.0% of the population were below the poverty line, including 11.1% of those under age 18 and 7.7% of those age 65 or over.

Economy

Top employers

Top employers in Manchester according to the town's 2019 Comprehensive Annual Financial Report.

As home to the Cheney family silk fortune, Manchester was a center of the American silk industry from the late 19th century to the mid-20th century, and was an integral component of not only the economy but success of the town. Today, the Cheney Brothers Historic District showcases mills refurbished as apartments and includes nearby museums.

Manchester posted a total revenue, as of 2017, of $202,901,000, with total expenditures of $199 million, including $133 million towards education. The median rent between 2013–2017 was $1,181, higher than both the county and state medians. The top employing industries are retail trade, health care and social assistance, manufacturing, and government; and the top employers are the Town of Manchester, the Board of Education, Eastern Connecticut Health Network, Inc., and Allied Printing.

The town is home to The Shoppes at Buckland Hills, as well as Shady Glen, a restaurant recognized by the James Beard Foundation in 2012 as an American classic, and has been featured on Food Network.

Arts and culture

Stemming from a heritage of historic culture, Manchester is home to the second-oldest operating pipe band in the United States, the Manchester Pipe Band, a grade 2 pipe band, which was founded in 1914. Cheney Hall is the home of The Little Theater of Manchester, a 60 year old community theater group. The city is also home to a nonprofit orchestra, the Manchester Symphony Orchestra and Chorale, which has been performing and educating youths in music in the community since 1960.

Manchester hosts four museums. The Fire Museum is housed in a restored 1901 firehouse building. The museum's firefighting equipment and memorabilia include leather fire buckets used in colonial times, a display showing the evolution of sprinkler systems, a horse-drawn hose wagon, a 1921 Ahrens-Fox fire pumper, and a  1911 water tower. The Lutz Children's Museum has participatory exhibits covering art, history, science, nature and ethnology. The museum's permanent collection includes small live animals. The Old Manchester Museum, focusing on local history, is operated by the Manchester Historical Society. Permanent exhibits include examples of Cheney silk, Pitkin glass, and Spencer Repeating Rifles; the museum also houses the Manchester Sports Hall of Fame. The Cheney Homestead Museum is an eighteenth-century house of the founders of the Cheney Brothers Silk Company. On exhibit are examples of period furniture and artwork. Also on site is the one-room Keeney Schoolhouse dating from 1751.

Wickham Park, a non-profit private foundation, is located on Manchester and East Hartford property. The  Oak Grove Nature Center is a nature preserve with rivers, ponds, and hiking trails and hosts educational nature classes aimed at children. Case Mountain Recreational Area, located in the less populated southeast corner of Manchester, is popular for hiking, mountain biking, and has a great view of the Hartford skyline to the west. Charter Oak Park, located in downtown, is popular for basketball, softball, and tennis, and includes four community soccer field. The park underwent a $2 million renovation in 2017 which improved existing infrastructure in addition to adding a musical garden, jogging tracks, bathrooms, and an upgraded playground.

The annual auto show Cruisin' on Main Street is held every August and is one of the largest shows of its kind in the northeast, showcasing over 14,000 vintage and rare vehicles and attracting over 400,000 visitors since its inception in 2001. The event has also endowed an annual scholarship for local area high school students pursuing further education.

Sports

Manchester Country Club opened in 1917 and was originally designed by Tom Bendelow and Deveroux Emmet. In 1935, it was redesigned in by A.W. Tillinghast. The golf course features a classical New England design and holds an annual open tournament.

Perhaps the most enduring sports legacy of the town is the Manchester Road Race, a 4.748 mile footrace which is held every Thanksgiving morning. It is the second most popular race in New England, behind the Boston Marathon. The event attracts over 10,000 participants, including Olympians, world record holders, and international athletes, in addition to thousands of spectators. The race was first run in 1927, and benefits muscular dystrophy research as well as over a dozen other charities.

The Manchester Silkworms, named for the town's storied past as a silk producer and the world's largest silk mill, were a collegiate summer baseball team founded in 2000. Several former players continued their career to the major leagues, including former Red Sox catcher and veteran Ryan Lavarnway. The team relocated to Laconia, New Hampshire after the 2009 season.

Government and politics

The town was governed in the old New England tradition of town meeting until 1907, when the town adopted a new charter, creating a more efficient method of governing, with a Board of Selectmen charged with the responsibility of running the town. In the mid-twentieth century, Manchester adopted a new charter constituting a council-manager government that is still in use today.

The legislative function is performed by a bipartisan Board of Directors consisting of nine board members, who are elected biennially for two year terms. The Board of Directors elects a Mayor from its membership for the two year term, and also appoints the General Manager.

Manchester is represented in the Connecticut General Assembly by State Representatives Jason Rojas (D-9), Jeffrey Currey (D-11), Geoff Luxenberg (D-12), and Jason Doucette (D-13), and by State Senator MD Rahman (D-4). At the federal level, Manchester is part of Connecticut's 1st congressional district and is represented in the House of Representatives by John Larson, in addition to being represented in the U.S. Senate by Richard Blumenthal and Chris Murphy.

Education

Public schools

Traditional district schools
 Manchester High School (grades 9–12)
 Howell Cheney Technical High School (grades 9–12)
 Bentley Alternative Education School (grades 9–12)
 Arthur H. Illing Middle School (grades 7–8)
 Manchester Middle Academy (grades 5–8)
 Elisabeth M. Bennet Academy (grades 5–6)
 William E. Buckley Elementary School (grades K–4)
 Bowers Elementary School (grades K–4)
 Highland Park Elementary School (grades K–4)
 Keeney Street Elementary School (grades K–4)
 Martin Elementary School (grades K–4)
 Verplanck Elementary School (grades K–4)
 Waddell Elementary School (grades K–4)
 Manchester Preschool Center (Pre-K)

Magnet schools

 Great Path Academy (grades 9–12)
 Discovery Academy (grades Pre-K–5)

Private schools

 Saint Bridget School (grades Pre-K–8)
 Saint James School (grades Pre-K–8)
 East Catholic High School (grades 9–12)
 The Cornerstone Christian School (grades Pre-K–12)
 Asamoah Society School (grades Pre-K–12)
 Pierre B. Arthur School (grades K–8)

Post-secondary education

 Manchester Community College, a two-year community college

Media

Newspaper

Manchester is home to a local newspaper, the Journal Inquirer, which serves all of Manchester and the surrounding areas. The Hartford Courant also has a facility in Manchester and can be delivered anywhere in town.

Emergency services

Ambulance service

Ambulance Service of Manchester (ASM) is a private, for-profit company that operates out of a station on New State Road in Manchester, and provides basic life support-level transport service. ASM also provides intercept and transport paramedic service to a number of towns in Hartford, Tolland, and Windham counties. ASM will provide advanced life support when fire department paramedics are unavailable.

Fire departments

Manchester Fire Rescue EMS

The Town of Manchester Fire-Rescue-EMS Department was organized in 1897 after a fire destroyed the Weldon business block. It is a full-time career department that operates from five strategically located firehouses. The department staffs three engine companies, one rescue engine company, one truck company, and a shift commander vehicle with a minimum of 17 on-duty personnel (five Lieutenants, eleven Firefighters, and one Battalion Chief). The department is an all hazards agency providing a range of services including fire suppression, fire prevention, vehicle extrication, high and low angle rope rescue, confined space rescue, hazardous materials response, and Advanced Life Support (paramedic level) medical care.

Manchester Fire Department-Eighth Utilities District

The Manchester Fire Department-Eighth Utilities District is a combination (paid and volunteer) fire department, established in 1888 as a separate fire department within the northwest corner of the town. It is not affiliated with the Town of Manchester government and is instead governed by its own board of directors. The department has 4 Firefighters on duty 24/7 with coverage provided by full time career firefighters and part time paid firefighters. On the weekdays during the hours of 0800–1600 staffing increases with the addition of one full time career Assistant Chief and one full time career Firefighter/Mechanic.  Volunteers provide additional coverage whenever available. The department provides fire suppression, fire prevention, rescue, hazardous material response, and Basic Life Support (EMT level) medical care.

Police department

The Manchester Police Department was established in 1896. It is staffed by approximately 120 officers. The department is led by Chief William Darby.

Infrastructure

Transportation

Roads

Manchester has parts of three interstate highways (I-84, I-384, and I-291) and Route 6 and Route 44 together constitute Manchester's principal east/west arterial. Connecticut Route 30 is an east/west arterial in the northern section of town. Connecticut Route 83 is Manchester's principal north/south arterial. Starting as South Main Street at the southern border with Glastonbury, Route 83 becomes Main Street through the center of town.

Public transportation

Manchester is served by the Hartford division of Connecticut Transit. Routes 80, 82, 83, 84, 85, 88, and 121 connect Manchester directly to the city of Hartford.

Rail

No passenger service currently exists in town. Freight service from Hartford is provided by Connecticut Southern Railroad.

The closest passenger rail service is available at Hartford's Union Station, approximately 10 miles west.

Airports

Bradley International Airport, in Windsor Locks, Connecticut, is twenty minutes north of downtown Hartford. It features over 150 daily departures to over 30 destinations on nine airlines. Other airports serving the Hartford area include:

 Hartford–Brainard Airport, found in Hartford off I-91 and close to Wethersfield, serves charter flights and local flights.
 Westover Metropolitan Airport, located in Chicopee, Massachusetts, 27 miles (43 km) north of Hartford, serves commercial, local, charter, and military flights
 Tweed New Haven Airport, located in New Haven, Connecticut, is served by Avelo Airlines

Bicycling

Manchester has several on and off-road bicycle routes. The two most popular routes are the Charter Oak Greenway and the Hop River State Park Trail. Portions of each of those routes have been designated as parts of the East Coast Greenway.

Notable people

Nathan G. Agostinelli, mayor and State Comptroller
Astrid Allwyn, 1930s movie actress
Elizabeth S. Anderson, philosopher and MacArthur Fellow
Geno Auriemma, head coach of UConn women's basketball team, 2012 and 2016 U.S. women's national team
Dick Berggren, motorsport announcer and magazine editor
Daniel C. Burbank, NASA astronaut
Russell Cheney, American Impressionist
Sherwood Cheney, US Army brigadier general
Carol Lynn Curchoe, reproductive biologist
Seth DeValve, football tight end for the Carolina Panthers
Dr. Dot, massage therapist
David Efianayi (born 1995), basketball player in the Israeli Basketball Premier League
Addie C. Strong Engle (1845–1926), author, publisher
Mary Ann Handley, former Connecticut state senator
Jay Johnstone, former professional baseball player and commentator
Larry Lisciotti, pool player
Jean Marzollo, children's author and illustrator
 Bill Masse, US Olympian
Henry Molaison, noted memory disorder patient
James B. Olcott, turfgrass farmer and influential citizen
Frederick Walker Pitkin, governor of Colorado from 1879 to 1883
Richard Plepler, television executive
Alberto Salazar, former world-class long-distance runner and 4x winner of Boston and New York marathons, and coach until he was banned for life
John Shea Jr., politician, jurist, businessman
Kory Sheets, former NFL player
Christopher Spencer, inventor of Spencer repeating rifle
Dana White, president of the Ultimate Fighting Championship

See also

 Hartford Distributors shooting
 Manchester Silkworms
 Truth Serum, an Eisner-nominated comic which takes place in Manchester

References

External links
 Town of Manchester official website
 Greater Manchester Chamber of Commerce
 

 
Populated places established in 1672
Towns in Hartford County, Connecticut
1672 establishments in Connecticut
Towns in Connecticut
Greater Hartford